Ali Al-Masoud (born 3 January 2004) is a Saudi Arabian professional footballer who plays as a forward for Pro League side Al-Fateh.

Career
Al-Masoud started his career at the youth teams of Al-Fateh. He was called up to the first-team after a number of first-team players tested positive for COVID-19. Al-Masoud made his first-team debut on 1 January 2022, coming off the bench against Al-Nassr.

References

External links
 

2004 births
Living people
Saudi Arabian footballers
Saudi Arabia youth international footballers
Association football forwards
Saudi Professional League players
Al-Fateh SC players